Bakan is a surname. Notable people with the surname include:

 Abigail Bakan (born 1954), Canadian academic
 David Bakan (1921–2004), American-Canadian psychologist and professor
 George Bakan (1941–2020), American newspaper editor and LGBT rights activist
 Joel Bakan (born 1959), American-Canadian lawyer, writer and academic
 Michael Bakan, American academic
 Seda Bakan (born 1985), Turkish actress